The Integrated Marine and Coastal Regionalisation of Australia (IMCRA), formerly the Interim Marine and Coastal Regionalisation for Australia, is a biogeographic regionalisation of the oceanic waters of Australia's exclusive economic zone (EEZ). As of 2008, the most recent version is IMCRA Version 4.0. 

IMCRA actually defines two bioregionalisations: a benthic bioregionalisation, based on biogeography of fish together with geophysical data; and a pelagic bioregionalisation, base on oceanographic characteristics.

The benthic bioregionalisation incorporates three separate regionalisations:
A regionalisation of the EEZ into provincial bioregions, based on the biogeography of bottom dwelling fishes. In IMCRA 4.0, 41 provincial bioregions, consisting of 24 provinces and 17 transitions.
A regionalisation of the continental shelf into meso-scale regions based on biological and physical characters, and the distance from the coast. In IMCRA 4.0 there are 60 meso-scale regions.
A regionalisation of the EEZ into 14 geomorphic units, formed by grouping the 1,134 geomorphic units defined by Geoscience Australia.

The pelagic bioregionalisation divides the continental shelf into four provincial bioregions based on pelagic fish species biodiversity and richness. Offshore waters are divided into three-dimensional water masses, taking into account water properties, circulation patterns and energetics.

List of provincial bioregions
This is a list of IMCRA 4.0 provincial bioregions:

List of Benthic meso-scale regions

Geomorphic units

There are 1,334 separate geomorphic units in Australia’s waters, in 14 categories. The regions represent distinct areas of geomorphic features that have similar characteristics (e.g. areas of the continental slope that contain canyons, or flat plains).

Geomorphic features are determined by bathymetric models (depth analysis) of the ocean floor and provide an important predictor of species assemblages at a large scale. For example, different species will occur on low-gradient terraces compared to those on the steep-walled submarine canyons.

Categories
Nomenclature of geomorphic features are based on definitions endorsed by the International Hydrographic Organization (IHO, 2001).

 Apron:Gently dipping featureless surface, underlain primarily by sediment, at the base of any steeper slope. 
 Bank, sandbank:Shallow water or submerged bank of sand in a sea or river that may be exposed at low tide
 Basin; terrace; plateau:Depression, characteristically in the deep sea floor, more or less equidimensional in plan and of variable extent;Relatively flat horizontal or gently inclined surface, sometimes long and narrow, which is bounded by a steeper ascending slope on one side and by a steeper descending slope on the opposite side;Flat or nearly flat area of considerable extent, dropping off abruptly on one or more sides.
 Canyon:A relatively narrow, deep depression with steep sides, the bottom of which generally has a continuous slope, developed characteristically on some continental slopes.
 Continental rise
 Deep; escarpment:Generally depths greater than 6,000 m; Elongated and comparatively steep slope separating or gently sloping areas.
 Knoll:Relatively small isolated elevation of a rounded shape.
 Pinnacle:High tower or spire-shaped pillar of rock or coral, alone or cresting a summit. It may extend above the surface of the water. It may or may not be a hazard to surface navigation
 Reef:Rock lying at or near the sea surface that may constitute a hazard to surface navigation
 Ridge; sill:(a) Long, narrow elevation with steep sides. (b) Long, narrow elevation often separating ocean basins. (c) Linked major mid-oceanic mountain systems of global extent;Sea floor barrier of relatively shallow depth restricting water movement between basins.
 Seamount:Large isolated elevation, greater than 1000 m in relief above the sea floor, characteristically of conical form.
 Shelf; abyssal plain:A gently sloping, flatter region adjacent to a continent (or around an island) or at abyssal depths.
 Slope:A sloped area seaward from the shelf edge to the upper edge of a continental rise or the point where there is a general reduction in slope. 
 Trench; saddle:Long narrow, characteristically very deep and asymmetrical depression of the sea floor, with relatively steep sides;Broad pass, resembling in shape a riding saddle, in a ridge or between contiguous seamounts.

See also
 Coastline of Australia
 Interim Biogeographic Regionalisation for Australia (IBRA)

External links
 Interactive Map, Commonwealth marine reserves

References

Biogeography of Australia
Coastline of Australia
Australia
Marine ecoregions
Marine biota of Oceania
Natural history of Australia
Exclusive economic zone of Australia